The Compass Project is the tenth studio album by Canadian country artist Brett Kissel. It is a four-part box set of albums that Kissel will release in 2023. The first part, South Album was released on January 27, 2023, via Big Star Recordings and ONErpm. The next three parts, East Album, West Album, and North Album, are set for release across the remainder of 2023.

Background
After holding desires to record a western-inspired album, an acoustic album, and a live album, Kissel made the decision to record all of these, along with a standard album in one project. The "North Album" is a live album containing live versions of Kissel's previous hits. The "East Album" is an acoustic album that Kissel intends to showcase his singer-songwriter side. The "South Album" is inspired by Nashville and the South, with Kissel noting how its songs are meant to target radio airplay. The "West Album" is intended to be a country and western album, inspired by the time Kissel has spent on his cattle ranch. Kissel views each album as a "specific direction" of his "internal compass", which provides fans with a "a 365-degree view" of his life and music. The project totals forty songs overall. 

Prior to releasing the "South Album", Kissel released the tracks "Ain't the Same", "Our Home", "Watch It", and "Never Have I Ever". He plans to release promotional singles from each album ahead of their release. Kissel stated that "Watch It" is his favourite song on the album as it "shares advice and wisdom for every parent to relate to". On the "East" and "West" albums, Kissel is the sole writer on many of the songs, and remarked that he was "nervous" to see how his fans and the music industry reacted to them. He co-wrote the track "Legacy" on the "West Album" with his uncle, which was inspired by the estate fight Kissel had to save his grandfather's ranch in Alberta.

Critical reception
Chad Huculak of the Edmonton Journal favourably reviewed "South Album", describing it as "precision-polished, with tracks expertly crafted to land on radio stations and playlists". He added that while there "isn't much experimentation or pushing of musical boundaries" on the album, it is nonetheless "some of the best music [Kissel has] produced in his career". Alan Cackett of NEO Music stated that the "South Album" is "certainly full of singalong songs that swim around and around your head hours after you’ve stopped listening," but framed the album as "passable," adding that it needed more songs like "Line in the Sand" to become an "essential listen". Andrew Ingram of Front Porch Music described the "South Album" as a "fantastic introduction" to the entire project, stating that it is "a showcase of Kissel’s songwriting ability and the authentic country sound that his fans have come to love".

Track listing

Charts

Singles

Release history

References

2023 albums
Brett Kissel albums